Tropical Cyclone Vania (RSMC Nadi designation 03F, JTWC designation 05P) was the third depression and first tropical cyclone of the 2010–11 South Pacific cyclone season.

Meteorological history

Over the next few days the disturbance gradually developed further before RSMC Nadi classified it as a tropical depression early on January 9. On January 11, the Joint Typhoon Warning Center initiated warnings on the system and monitored it as Tropical Cyclone 05P. On the Next day, RSMC Nadi upgraded the depression into a Category 1 tropical cyclone and named it "Vania". Later that day, RSMC Nadi reported that Vania had intensified into a Category 2 tropical cyclone. Early the next day, RSMC Nadi upgraded Vania into a Category 3 severe tropical cyclone. Later that day, RSMC Nadi reported that Vania started weakening and downgraded it into a Category 2 tropical cyclone. Subsequently, it was downgraded to a category 1 tropical cyclone on January 14. On January 15, JTWC issued their final warning on the system. Soon, issuing their final advisory, RSMC Nadi downgraded Vania into a Tropical Depression.

Preparations and impact
While it was active Cyclone Vania affected Fiji, Vanuatu, New Caledonia, Norfolk Island and New Zealand. Due to the impact of this storm, the name Vania was retired from the lists of tropical cyclone names and was replaced with Vanessa.

Fiji
In Fiji, heavy rains associated with the initial disturbance brought significant flooding to many islands. Several roads were temporarily shut down due to rising waters, though no homes were affected. Although the center of Vania continued to move away from Fiji, the storm's outer bands brought continued rainfall to the country.

Vanuatu
As the storm passed through Vanuatu, winds of 140 km/hr affected Tafea Province, and contact with this group of islands was lost. Many buildings were damaged and trees were felled.

The National Disaster Management Office of Vanuatu enacted a 156.6 million vatu (US$1.6 million) relief plan for Tafea Province, with the vast majority of funds going to food items.

New Caledonia
Within 24 hours of the storm's arrival in New Caledonia, a large magnitude 7.0 earthquake struck the Loyalty Islands within the archipelago. Damage totaled to $11 million (2011 USD).

Norfolk Island and New Zealand
The residents of New Zealand were informed about the low that would strike the country. They were informed about tropical moisture that could be pulled into the country by the low.

See also
2010–11 South Pacific cyclone season

References

External links

World Meteorological Organization
Fiji Meteorological Service (RSMC Nadi)
Joint Typhoon Warning Center (JTWC) 

2010–11 South Pacific cyclone season
Tropical cyclones in Fiji
Tropical cyclones in Vanuatu
Tropical cyclones in New Caledonia
2011 in Vanuatu
2011 in Fiji
2011 in New Caledonia
Retired South Pacific cyclones
Category 2 South Pacific cyclones
Vania